Una Noche en El Relámpago is a 1950 Argentine film directed by Miguel Coronatto Paz. The film stars Cristina de los Llanos, Guido Gorgatti, Mangacha Gutiérrez and Tincho Zabala.

Cast
Cristina de los Llanos
Guido Gorgatti
Mangacha Gutiérrez
Tincho Zabala

External links
 

1950 films
1950s Spanish-language films
Argentine black-and-white films
Argentine comedy films
1950 comedy films
1950s Argentine films